Chouteau Township is located in Madison County, Illinois, in the United States. As of the 2010 census, its population was 8,226 and it contained 3,438 housing units.

History
Chouteau Township was named for a member of the Chouteau family.

Geography

Demographics

References

External links
City-data.com
Illinois State Archives

Townships in Madison County, Illinois
Townships in Illinois